Armed Forces Arming Authority (formerly known as "Technical Authority") is one of the Egyptian Ministry of Defense agencies.

Foundation 

Established on November 2, 1967 by decision of President Gamal Abdel Nasser, headed by Major General Abid Hamid Mahmud, who was entrusted with the establishment and organization of the Authority. The aim was to rebuild and organize land, air, and airdefense forces and the other branches of the armed forces to raise technical efficiency after the previous defeats by the Israeli defense forces.

1967 establishments in Africa
Defence agencies of Egypt